The Errington Baronetcy, of Ness in the County Palatine of Chester, was created in the Baronetage of the United Kingdom on 26 June 1963 for Sir Eric Errington, a British barrister, Royal Air Force Officer and Conservative politician who served as a Member of Parliament from 1935 to 1970. He was Chairman of the Executive Committee of the National Union of Conservative and Unionist Associations and was knighted in the 1952 Queen's Birthday Honours List. His eldest son, Sir Geoffrey, inherited the Baronetcy upon his death in 1973. Colonel Sir Geoffrey Frederick Errington Bt, OBE (15 February 1926 – 3 October 2015) was Colonel of The King's Regiment between 1975 and 1986. He was appointed Fellow, Royal Society of Arts (F.R.S.A.) in 1994. He was appointed Officer, Order of the British Empire (O.B.E.) in 1998. He married Diana Kathleen Forbes Davenport, daughter of Edward Barry Davenport, on 24 September 1955. Sir Robin Errington succeeded as the 3rd Baronet of Ness in 2015 and is the present holder of the Baronetcy today. 

The Stanley, later Stanley-Massey-Stanley, later Errington Baronetcy, of Hooton in the County of Chester, was created in the Baronetage of England on 17 June 1661 for William Stanley, the great-grandson of Sir William Stanley, of Hooton and Stourton, a member of the Stanley family headed by the Earl of Derby. The sixth Baronet assumed the surname Stanley-Massey-Stanley. The ninth Baronet married Mary Haggerston, great-niece and heiress of Henry Errington of Sandhoe House, Northumberland. Their eldest son, the tenth Baronet, represented Pontefract in Parliament. Their second son, Rowland Stanley, the eleventh Baronet, inherited the Errington estate in Northumberland and changed his name and arms to Errington. The title became extinct on the death of the twelfth Baronet in 1893.

The Errington Baronetcy, of Lackham Manor in the County of Wiltshire, was created in the Baronetage of the United Kingdom on 18 July 1885 for George Errington, Member of Parliament for Longford. The title became extinct on his death in 1920.

Errington Baronets, of Ness (1963)
Sir Eric Errington, 1st Baronet (1900–1973)
Sir Geoffrey Frederick Errington, 2nd Baronet (1926–2015)
Sir Robin Davenport Errington, 3rd Baronet (born 1957)
The heir apparent to the baronetcy is Sir Robin's son, Oliver Marcus Errington (born 2001)

Errington Baronet, of Lackham Manor (1885, Extinct) 
Sir George Errington, 1st Baronet (1839–1920)

Stanley, later Stanley-Massey-Stanley, later Errington Baronets, of Hooton (1661, Extinct) 

Sir William Stanley, 1st Baronet (1628–1673)
Sir Rowland Stanley, 2nd Baronet (1653–1737)
Sir William Stanley, 3rd Baronet (1679–1740)
Sir Rowland Stanley, 4th Baronet (1707–1771)	
Sir William Stanley, 5th Baronet (circa 1753–1792)
Sir John Stanley-Massey-Stanley, 6th Baronet (1711–1794)
Sir Thomas Stanley-Massey-Stanley, 7th Baronet (circa 1755–1795)
Sir William Stanley-Massey-Stanley, 8th Baronet (circa 1780–1800)
Sir Thomas Stanley-Massey-Stanley, 9th Baronet (1782–1841)
Sir William Thomas Stanley-Massey-Stanley, 10th Baronet (1806–1863)	
Sir Rowland Errington, 11th Baronet (1809–1875) 	
Sir John Errington, 12th Baronet (1810–1893)

References
Kidd, Charles, Williamson, David (editors). Debrett's Peerage and Baronetage (1990 edition). New York: St Martin's Press, 1990.

Baronetcies in the Baronetage of the United Kingdom
Extinct baronetcies in the Baronetage of England
Extinct baronetcies in the Baronetage of the United Kingdom
1661 establishments in England